Buildcon FC is a Zambian football club based in Ndola that plays in the MTN/FAZ Super Division. It is known for having an African multi-national squad.

History
Buildcon were founded in Choma as AM Welding in 2012.

Buildcon were promoted to the Zambian Premier League in 2017 after winning the Division One. Before the 2017 season the club changed its name and city, relocating north to Ndola. The club had been sold to Buildcon Investments, a Ndola building company, after the start of the 2016 season. Buildcon had originally petitioned to change their name after the first game of the 2016 season, but were not allowed.

After their promotion, Buildcon developed a reputation as heavy spenders. They were the first team in the Zambian league to register more than 25 foreign players on their books and frequently fielded teams of 11 non-Zambian players. The non-Zambian influence helped Buildcon avoid immediate relegation, finishing ninth on their debut 2017 Premier League season.

Buildcon dropped 14 foreign players and added more Zambian players for the 2018 season including international Chisamba Lungu.

Players

First-team players

Notable former players
 Isaac Isinde
 Kezron kizito

References

Football clubs in Zambia
Ndola